The Storm Within is a 2013 Canadian drama film. Directed by Martin Doepner, the film is set in 1799 and stars Isabelle Guérard as Espérance, a young mother who is forced to shelter five British soldiers from a snowstorm. The film also stars Lothaire Bluteau, Anthony Lemke, Vincent Leclerc, Arthur Holden and Peter Miller.

The film garnered three Canadian Screen Award nominations at the 2nd Canadian Screen Awards, including a Best Actress nod for Guérard and two nominations for the music of Michel Cusson, for Best Original Score and Best Original Song for "À la claire fontaine".

References

External links

2013 films
Canadian thriller drama films
Quebec films
2013 thriller drama films
2013 drama films
French-language Canadian films
2010s English-language films
English-language Canadian films
2010s Canadian films